is a prolific Japanese character designer and director from Urayasu, Chiba. Amemiya is known for his distinctive fantasy designs and directorial style.

Biography 
After graduation from the Asagaya College of Art and Design, he joined the Den Film Effect in 1981. 
As a film director, he made his debut in 1988's Mirai Ninja: Keigumo Kinin Gaiden. Major works include science fiction film Zeiram released in 1991 and tokusatsu franchise Garo created in 2006.

Filmography

TV and film 
 Choujin Sentai Jetman (TV): director, character designer (Demon Machine Veronica)
 G-9 (OVA): screenplay, original creator and director
 GARO (TV): creator, character designer and director
 Iria: Zeiram the Animation (OVA): original concept, visual setting
 Jikuu Senshi Spielban: monster designs, director
 Kamen Rider BLACK (TV): character designer 
 Kamen Rider BLACK RX (TV): character designer
 Kamen Rider Decade (TV): character designer (Kaima Robot Schwarian, episodes 26 & 27)
 Kamen Rider J (live-action movie): director, monster designer
 Kamen Rider ZO (live-action movie): director, monster designer
 Kidou Keiji Jiban (TV): creator
 Kyoryu Sentai Zyuranger (TV): director (2 episodes)
 Lady Battle Cop (live-action movie): character designer
 Mechanical Violator Hakaider (live-action movie): director
 Mirai Ninja: director, character designer
 Shin Kamen Rider: Prologue (live-action special): SFX supervision
 Shougeki Gouraigan: creator, character designer
 Sword Gai: The Animation : original character designer
 Tao no tsuki: Makaraga (live action movie): director, screenplay, character designer
 Tekkouki Mikazuki: original creator and director
 Tokkei Winspector (TV): character designer
 Tweeny Witches (TV): original creator
 Ultraman USA (animation movie): monster designer
 Zeiram (live action movie): director, character designer
 Zeiram 2 (live-action movie) : director, screenplay, original creator

Video games 
Clock Tower 3: character designs
Dual Heroes: character designs
Final Fantasy XIV: Return to Ivalice boss designs.
Genji: Days of the Blade: art direction
Hagane: The Final Conflict: character designs
Nanatsu Kaze no Shima Monogatari: character designs
Onimusha 2: Samurai's Destiny: character designs
Onimusha 3: Demon Siege: character designs from Onimusha 2
Rudra no Hihō: character designs and director
Shin Megami Tensei IV: creature designs

Other 
Convention appearances (one time): Anime Expo (1993-07-02 to 1993-07-04)

External links 

 
 
Keita Amemiya fansite

1959 births
Living people
Anime character designers
Japanese film directors
Anime directors
Japanese animated film directors
People from Chiba Prefecture